Cleveland was a ceremonial county located in northern England. It was created in 1974 under the Local Government Act 1972, and named after the historic area of Cleveland, Yorkshire. The county was abolished in 1996. The area was partitioned between the four boroughs of Hartlepool, Stockton-on-Tees, Middlesbrough and Langbaurgh-on-Tees, the latter of which took its name from the former Langbaurgh East. The county town was Middlesbrough. The administrative county bordered County Durham to the north and North Yorkshire to the south, and it faced the North Sea to the east. The legacy of the county lives on in some public bodies, such as Cleveland Police.

Formation
A Bill as originally presented in November 1971 that intended the administrative county to have been an extended form of the then present county borough of Teesside, an independent district in the North Riding from 1968 to 1974. On 1 April 1974, by the Local Government Act 1972, most of the then Cleveland constituency and Hartlepool were incorporated as the Cleveland non-metropolitan county.

Proposed abolition
Local government reorganisation, recommended by the Banham Review and accepted by the government, meant that each district borough be re-organised into separate unitary authorities with the Tees be re-established as a ceremonial border between North Yorkshire and County Durham. The county district boroughs of Cleveland were re-organised into Hartlepool, Stockton-on-Tees, Middlesbrough and Redcar and Cleveland. The reorganisation meant that Stockton-on-Tees became the only local authority in England to be split between two counties.

This split was contested by Cleveland County Council, who applied for judicial review over the decision. According to the Minister, David Curry, in the Commons debate on the order on 11 January 1995, this caused a delay from 1 April 1995 as the reorganisation date to 1 April 1996.

Abolition
As the first of the Orders to be laid before Parliament, it was done in two stages:

The Cleveland (Structural Change) Order 1995 abolished the County Council (to take place on 1 April 1996) and transferred its powers to the district councils, though it did not abolish Cleveland itself. It also renamed Langbaurgh-on-Tees as Redcar and Cleveland. 

The Cleveland (Further Provision) Order 1995 abolished the county of Cleveland altogether, creating in its place four counties corresponding to the four boroughs. However, the requirement for counties to have a council was removed for these four counties in particular.

The Lieutenancies Act 1997 placed each district within the ceremonial county of Durham or North Yorkshire, also splitting Stockton-on-Tees along the Tees.

Town twinning

Cleveland, as a conurbation of settlements, was twinned with:
  Cleveland, Ohio, United States

Statistical
NUTS statistical regions of the United Kingdom were also introduced in 1974. This caused South Humberside to be put with the reformed counties using the name Yorkshire, to form Yorkshire and Humber. South Tees came under North East of England region.

See also
Teesside
Tees Valley
Trolleybuses in Teesside
Teesside Fettlers

References

External links

 

 
Places in the Tees Valley
History of County Durham
History of the Borough of Hartlepool
Metropolitan areas of England
Counties of England established in 1974
Counties of England disestablished in 1996